Actinopolyspora righensis is a halophilic actinomycete first isolated from Saharan soil in Algeria. Its aerial mycelium produce long, straight or flexuous spore chains with non-motile, smooth-surfaced and rod-shaped spores. Its type strain is H23T (=DSM 45501T = CCUG 63368T = MTCC 11562T).

References

Further reading
Issues in Physiology, Cell Biology, and Molecular Medicine: 2011 Edition, ScholarlyEditions, Jan 9, 2012 - 922 pages.

External links
LPSN
Type strain of Actinopolyspora righensis at BacDive -  the Bacterial Diversity Metadatabase

Actinomycetia
Bacteria described in 2014